Faeculoides plumbifusa is a moth of the family Erebidae first described by George Hampson in 1907. It is known from the mountains of central Sri Lanka.

Adults have been found in September.

The wingspan is about 11 mm. The forewing is long and narrow and the reniform stigma is narrow. It is blackish, except at the ventral margin where it is brown on both sides of the black postmedial line. The fringes are blackish. The crosslines are almost untraceable. There is an indistinct discal spot on the hindwing.

References

Micronoctuini
Moths described in 1907